David Nathaniel Spergel is an American theoretical astrophysicist and the Emeritus Charles A. Young Professor of Astronomy on the Class of 1897 Foundation at Princeton University. Since 2021, he has been the President of the Simons Foundation. He is known for his work on the Wilkinson Microwave Anisotropy Probe (WMAP) project.

Early life and education 
Spergel was born to a Jewish family in Rochester, New York. His father, Martin Spergel, was also a physicist and a professor at York College, City University of New York; he died in 2021. The junior Spergel attended John Glenn High School in Huntington, New York. He has a brother and a sister.

Spergel graduated summa cum laude with a Bachelor of Arts (AB) from Princeton University in 1982, after completing a senior thesis on red giants under the supervision of Gillian R. Knapp. He then went to the University of Oxford as a visiting scholar in 1983, where he studied with James Binney. He obtained his Master of Arts (AM) in 1984 and his PhD in 1985, both from Harvard University.

Career 
At the invitation of John N. Bahcall, Spergel joined the Institute for Advanced Studies after his PhD. He left and moved to Princeton University in 1987 as an assistant professor. He was promoted to associate professor in 1992 and full professor in 1997. In 2007, he was appointed the Charles A. Young Professor of Astronomy on the Class of 1897 Foundation.

Spergel joined the Flatiron Institute in 2016 as the founding director of the Center for Computational Astrophysics. Citing the hesitance to hold onto 2 positions, he retired from Princeton University in 2019 at the age of 59, and has remained as emeritus professor since.

Spergel is a 2001 MacArthur Fellow, and was a member of the NASA Advisory Council and chair of the Space Studies Board. He was the Keck Distinguished Visiting Professor at the Institute for Advanced Study from 2000 to 2001.

Since 1994, Spergel is part of the Wilkinson Microwave Anisotropy Probe (WMAP) project consortium. Currently, he is a member of the Simons Observatory, chairs the Science Definition Team of the Nancy Grace Roman Space Telescope (formerly known as the Wide-Field Infrared Survey Telescope), and sits on the Board of Trustees of the Carnegie Institution for Science (since 2022).

In 2022, NASA invited Spergel to lead the a team of scientists to investigate unidentified flying objects, termed "unidentified aerial phenomena" by NASA.

Honors and awards 
 Helen B. Warner Prize for Astronomy (1994)
 Member of the National Academy of Sciences (2007)
 Shaw Prize in Astronomy (2010)
 Member of the American Academy of Arts and Sciences (2012)
 25 Most Influential Space Scientists, Time (2012)
 Nature's 10 (2014)
 Dannie Heineman Prize for Astrophysics (2015)
 NASA Exceptional Public Service Medal (2017)
 Breakthrough Prize in Fundamental Physics (2018)
 Legacy Fellow of the American Astronomical Society (2020)
 NASA Exceptional Public Service Medal (2022) (received the second time)

References

Further reading 
 Goodman, Billy. (2002) "Big Days for the Big Bang". Princeton Alumni Weekly, p. 24.
 Current Biography Yearbook Vol. 66 (2005). H. W. Wilson Company. pp. 535–536.

External links 
 

1961 births
Living people
MacArthur Fellows
Members of the United States National Academy of Sciences
21st-century American astronomers
20th-century American astronomers
Fellows of the American Physical Society
Fellows of the American Academy of Arts and Sciences
Harvard University alumni
Princeton University alumni
Winners of the Dannie Heineman Prize for Astrophysics
Fellows of the American Astronomical Society